John B. Veihmeyer (born 29 June 1959) was global chairman of KPMG from April 2014 till September 2017. He previously served as chairman and chief executive officer of KPMG's U.S. firm for a five-year term from 10 June 2010 until 9 June 2015. William B Thomas, 49, has been elected Chairman of KPMG International. He will lead the KPMG global network of professional services firms for a 4-year term, effective 1 October 2017, succeeding John B Veihmeyer, 61, who is completing his term as Chairman and retiring from the firm, at the end of September 2017.

Veihmeyer previously served as a member of Chairman Christopher Cox's SEC Advisory Committee on Smaller Public Companies; Saint Mary's College Board of Trustees; Board Chairman of the Cultural Alliance of Greater Washington; Executive Committee of the Boards of the Federal City Council and Greater Washington Board of Trade.

Veihmeyer is a member of the Business Roundtable and the Mendoza College Business Advisory Council of the University of Notre Dame, from which he graduated.

Education
Veihmeyer is based in New York City and is a BBA in Accounting from University of Notre Dame - Mendoza College of Business.

Philanthropy
He is co-chair of CEOs Against Cancer and is a board member of the Committee Encouraging Corporate Philanthropy.

Awards and recognition
Veihmeyer has been consistently named as one of the "Top 100 Most Influential People in Accounting" by Accounting Today magazine, and one of the Top 100 Most Influential People in Corporate Governance by Directorship Magazine. In 2013, Mr. Veihmeyer was honored as "Responsible CEO of the Year" by Corporate Responsibility Magazine.  In 2011, he received the CEO Leadership Award from Diversity Best Practices for his commitment to diversity, and he has also been recognized for his work on KPMG's Family for Literacy (KFFL), a signature community outreach initiative dedicated to fighting childhood illiteracy.

Association with KPMG
Career with KPMG:

Board Membership
Board membership:

References

1955 births
American chief executives of financial services companies
KPMG people
Living people
People from Washington, D.C.
University of Notre Dame alumni